Clues is the sixth studio album by Robert Palmer, released in 1980. It has a rockier, new wave edge compared to his previous releases. The album peaked at number 59 on the Billboard Top Pop Albums chart and No. 31 in the UK in 1980. The album also peaked at No. 1 in Sweden, No. 3 in France, No. 15 in the Netherlands and No. 42 in Italy. Donald Guarisco of AllMusic described Clues as "one of Robert Palmer's strongest and most consistent albums", despite being somewhat short at 31 minutes.

Palmer, who played percussion on Talking Heads' Remain in Light, had the favour returned when the band's drummer Chris Frantz played bass drum on "Looking for Clues" along with Palmer's drummer, Dony Wynn.  Andy Fraser, the former bassist of Free and the author of Palmer's first breakthrough single "Every Kinda People", played bass on the album on two songs. New wave musician Gary Numan co-wrote a song with Palmer (another co-write between the two appearing on Maybe It's Live) and played keyboards on a remake of his own song "I Dream of Wires". This was first issued on CD in 1985 when Island's catalogue was issued under WEA Manufacturing. The WEA pressings are sought-after collector's items.

The video to the first track on the album, "Looking for Clues", aired on MTV's first day of broadcasting on 1 August 1981.

The album was certified gold in Germany by BMieV in 1992.

Songs
The lead track, "Looking for Clues" was described by AllMusic as "a clever slice of new wave pop that surprises the listener with an unexpected xylophone solo".

"I Dream of Wires" is a cover of a song from Gary Numan's album Telekon released the same year.

The cover of the Beatles' "Not a Second Time", featured a second verse added by Palmer.

Track listing
All songs by Robert Palmer except where noted.
"Looking for Clues" – 4:52
"Sulky Girl" – 4:07
"Johnny and Mary" – 3:59
"What Do You Care" – 2:44
"I Dream of Wires" (Gary Numan) – 4:34
"Woke Up Laughing" – 3:36
"Not a Second Time" (John Lennon, Paul McCartney) – 2:48
"Found You Now" (Gary Numan, Robert Palmer) – 4:37

Personnel
Robert Palmer – vocals, guitar, bass guitar, drums (track 6), percussion, production
Dony Wynn – drums
Jack Waldman – keyboards
Kenny Mazur – guitar (tracks 1, 2, 7)
Chris Frantz – drums (track 1)
Andy Fraser – bass guitar (tracks 2, 7)
Alan Mansfield – guitar (track 3)
Paul Gardiner – bass guitar (track 5)
Gary Numan – keyboards (track 5)

Technical
Alex Sadkin – engineer, mixing
David Harper – executive producer
Graham Hughes – cover
Cover photograph taken by Susan Palmer in Nassau, Bahamas
Mastering engineer – Ted Jensen at Sterling Sound, NYC

Charts

Weekly charts

Year-end charts

Certifications and sales

See also
 List of albums released in 1980

References

Robert Palmer (singer) albums
1980 albums
Island Records albums
Albums produced by Robert Palmer (singer)
New wave albums by English artists